Margaret Jean Callender (married name Margaret Whitbread, born 1939) is a female former athlete who competed for England.

Athletics career
She represented England in the javelin at the 1958 British Empire and Commonwealth Games in Cardiff, Wales.

Personal life
She married John Whitbread in 1959. During 1975 the couple adopted Fatima Whitbread and Margaret coached her at javelin.

References

1939 births
English female javelin throwers
Athletes (track and field) at the 1958 British Empire and Commonwealth Games
Living people
Commonwealth Games competitors for England